Manderveen is a village in the Dutch province of Overijssel. It is a part of the municipality of Tubbergen, and lies about 13 km northeast of Almelo.

It was first mentioned in 1846 as Manderveen, and means peat area near Mander

References

Populated places in Overijssel
Tubbergen